Harris Lake, or Shearon Harris Reservoir, is a reservoir in New Hill, North Carolina. It is the source and outlet of cooling water for the Shearon Harris nuclear power plant. The lake is adjacent but not connected to B. Everett Jordan Lake. It was created by impounding Buckhorn Creek. There are two public boat ramps; one is near the southern end off North Carolina Highway 42, and the other near the northern end by Avent Ferry Road.

Harris Lake County Park is located on the northeastern section of the lake. The park was leased to Wake County by Duke Energy in 1985, and opened to the public in 1999. The 680-acre park features five miles of hiking trails, almost eight miles of bike trails, and other amenities including picnic areas, a fishing pier, and a disc golf course. The park is home to several historic sites from an agricultural community, including the remains of the Womble, Smith, and Holleman households. The park also protects valuable Longleaf Pine forests.

References

External links
 http://www.wakegov.com/parks/harrislake/Pages/default.aspx
 https://web.archive.org/web/20130105074838/http://www.trailsofnc.com/harris_lake/

Reservoirs in North Carolina
Protected areas of Wake County, North Carolina
Protected areas of Chatham County, North Carolina
Bodies of water of Wake County, North Carolina
Bodies of water of Chatham County, North Carolina